The women's 400 metres hurdles event at the 2008 World Junior Championships in Athletics was held in Bydgoszcz, Poland, at Zawisza Stadium on 9, 10 and 11 July.

Medalists

Results

Final
11 July

Semifinals
10 July

Semifinal 1

Semifinal 2

Heats
9 July

Heat 1

Heat 2

Heat 3

Heat 4

Participation
According to an unofficial count, 29 athletes from 23 countries participated in the event.

References

400 metres hurdles
400 metres hurdles at the World Athletics U20 Championships
2008 in women's athletics